Cibicides is a genus of cosmopolitan benthic foraminifera known from at least as far back as the Paleocene (Loeblich & Tappan, 1988) that  extends down to the present.

The test, or shell, of Cibicides, which is commonly found attached, is multichambered, plano-convex, trochospiral, with a flat or dished-out evolute spiral side and a strongly arched,  involute umbilical side. The test wall is calcareous, perforate, bilamellar, with a radial microstructure. The flat or nearly flat spiral side is coarsely perforate while the arched umbilical side is finely perforate.  The apertural face and peripheral keel, where the two faces meet, are imperforate. Sutures on the spiral side are thickened and may be elevated, but are narrow and depressed on the umbilical side. The aperture a low interio-marginal equatorial opening that extends a short distance onto the umbilical side but continues along the spiral suture on the spiral side.

Cibicides, named by Montfort, 1808, is included in the subfamily Cibicidinae, family Cibicididae, superfamily Planorbulinacea; suborder Rotaliina in Loeblich and Tappan, 1987 and order Rotaliida in Loeblack and Tappan, 1992. It was put, instead, in the Orbitoidacea in Loeblcih and Tappan, 1964, in the Treatise Part C, and in the Anomalinidae in Cushman, 1950.

References 

 Joseph A. Cushman, 1950. Foraminifera, their classification and economic use. Harvard University Press, Cambridge, Massachusetts. 4th edition, 1950
 Alfred R. Loeblich, Jr. and Helen Tappan, 1964. Sarcodina, chiefy "Thecamoebians" and Foraminiferida. Treatise on Invertebrate Paleontology, Part C, Protista 2.  Geological Society of America and University of Kansas Press, 1964.
 Alfred R. Loeblich, Jr and Helen Tappan, 1988. Forminiferal Genera and their classification
 Geological Survey of Iran, (e-book) 2005. 
 Alfred R. Loeblich, Jr. and Helen Tappan, 1992. Systematics of Modern Foraminifera, revised in Sen Gupta (ed) 2002, Modern Foraminifera

Further reading

External links 

 
 
 Cibicides at the World Register of Marine Species (WoRMS)

Cibicididae
Rotaliida genera
Extant Paleocene first appearances